Philip Barry (1896–1949) was an American playwright.

Philip Barry may also refer to:

Philip de Barry ( 1183) of the De Barry family
P. J. (Philip James) Barry, American playwright and author of The Octette Bridge Club

See also